Brand is a hamlet in the municipality of Beekdaelen in the province of Limburg, the Netherlands.
It is one of the so-called Bovengehuchten, or Upper Hamlets, of Beekdaelen. Brand is located south of the stream Platsbeek.

The hamlet consists of five houses along the Branterweg. This road connects the hamlets Tervoorst and Helle.
Some houses, including a farm named , are constructed with timber framing.
Brand is often mistakenly regarded as part of the nearby hamlet Terstraten. Brand got its own town sign in 2003.

References

 Hoven, Frank van den (2003) Op ontdekkingsreis door Zuid-Limburg : Reisgids en naslagwerk voor toeristen en streekbewoners (Filatop Streekreeks nr.3). , p. 420 

Populated places in Limburg (Netherlands)
Beekdaelen